"Drive (For Daddy Gene)" is a song written and recorded by American country music singer Alan Jackson. It was released in January 2002 as the second single from his album, Drive. It reached number one on the U.S. Billboard Hot Country Singles & Tracks in May 2002 and also peaked at number 28 on the Billboard Hot 100.

Content
The song is dedicated to Alan's father, Eugene Jackson, who died on January 31, 2000. In the song, Alan recalls as a child he and his father driving around the countryside in an old beat up truck that they fixed up together, as well as a boat they would drive around the lake. In the final verse, Alan talks about sharing his childhood experiences with his daughters and letting them drive his Jeep around their pasture.

Critical reception
Chuck Taylor, of Billboard magazine reviewed the song favorably saying that it's "a heartfelt lyric that allows listeners to share a stroll down memory lane with Jackson and appreciate a kinder, simpler time". Taylor also says that Jackson delivers the song with "the same honesty, integrity, and emotional warmth that has always made listeners powerfully connect to his work".

Music video
The music video, directed by Steven Goldmann and animated by The Illusion Factory, follows the plot of the story by showing scenes of a boy and his father driving around in a speedboat and later in his truck. The scene for the final verse shows Jackson driving around in a Jeep with his three daughters. The whole video is presented as animated pictures in a story coming to life out of a book. The music video was nominated for Music Video of the Year in the top award shows and won the award for Best Music Video in the Country Music Awards.

Cover versions
When Jackson was honored by "CMT Giants," country singer Taylor Swift sang "Drive" as a tribute.

Chart positions
"Drive (For Daddy Gene)" debuted at number 53 on the U.S. Billboard Hot Country Singles & Tracks for the week of February 2, 2002.

Year-end charts

References

2002 singles
2002 songs
Alan Jackson songs
Songs written by Alan Jackson
Commemoration songs
Music videos directed by Steven Goldmann
Song recordings produced by Keith Stegall
Arista Nashville singles